Christophe Porcu (born 5 May 1971 in Mauvezin, Gers, France) is a French international rugby union player. He played as a Lock for Agen and USA Perpignan. 
He started his career at SU Agen but he moved in 2002 to USA Perpignan where he was finalist of the Heineken Cup in 2003. He left Perpignan for playing Fédérale 3 with Torreilles but after one season he returned to USA Perpignan.

External links
Christophe Porcu International Statistics

1971 births
French rugby union players
Living people
France international rugby union players
Rugby union locks